The MacDonald Letter  of 13 February 1931, also known as the Black Letter, was a letter from British prime minister Ramsay MacDonald to Chaim Weizmann, prominent Zionist leader, in response to the Passfield White Paper.  The White Paper limited Jewish immigration to Palestine and Jewish purchase of Arab land.  Zionist organizations worldwide mounted a vigorous campaign against the document, which culminated in MacDonald's "clarification" of the White Paper, reaffirming British support for the continuation of Jewish immigration and land purchase in Palestine.  It was considered a withdrawal of the Passfield White Paper, despite the fact that Prime Minister said in parliament on 11 February 1931 that he was "very unwilling to give the letter the same status as the dominating document" i.e. the Passfield White Paper.  The letter itself also claimed the importance of justice for "non-Jewish sections of the community".

In secret testimony to the Peel Commission, Weizmann acknowledged that he was sent a draft of the letter in advance so that he could make necessary amendments.

Arabs renounced the letter as the "Black Letter", primarily upset because Jewish immigration continued with increasing numbers, the purchase of land by Jews continued without restrictions, and the steps taken to protect Arab tenant farmers from being removed from their land were ineffective.  By confirming that the policy of the Palestine Mandate was to continue to support Jewish immigration, the letter in effect negated the implications of the White Paper and facilitated increasing immigration during the growth of anti-semitism in Europe in the 1930s.

External links
 The letter in full from Hansard

References 
Notes

Bibliography
 Hymanson, Albert M. (1942) Palestine: A Policy. London: Methuene.
 Shapira, Anita (2014). Ben-Gurion – Father of Modern Israel. New Haven and London: Yale University Press. .

Pre-1948 Zionist documents
White papers
1931 documents
Mandatory Palestine
Letters (message)
Ramsay MacDonald